Michael Wallis (born October 7, 1945) is an American journalist, popular historian, author and speaker. He has written seventeen books, including Route 66: The Mother Road, about the historic highway U.S. Route 66. His work has also been published extensively in magazines and newspapers, including Time, Life, People, Smithsonian, The New Yorker, and The New York Times.

Awards and honors
Wallis has received the John Steinbeck Award, the Arrell Gibson Lifetime Achievement Award from the Oklahoma Center for the Book, the Will Rogers Spirit Award, and the Western Heritage Award from the National Cowboy Hall & Western Heritage Museum.  He has been inducted into the Oklahoma Writers Hall of Fame, Writers Hall of Fame of America, and the Oklahoma Historians Hall of Fame, and was the first inductee into the Oklahoma Route 66 Hall of Fame.  
Wallis was interviewed by Rep. Roy Blunt (R-Missouri) for After Words on Book TV, 29 April 2007, discussing his latest book, Billy the Kid:  The Endless Ride.

Other work
Wallis also provided the voice of Sheriff in the Disney·Pixar Cars franchise.

Personal life
Wallis was born in St. Louis, Missouri. He graduated from Western Military Academy in Alton, Illinois, in 1963. He later attended the University of Missouri in Columbia, and moved to Miami, Florida, in 1978, where he worked for Time's Caribbean Bureau. He currently lives in Tulsa, Oklahoma, with his wife, Suzanne Fitzgerald Wallis.

Bibliography

Filmography

Film
Cars (2006) as Sheriff (voice)
Mater and the Ghostlight (2006, Video short) as Sheriff (voice)
Cars 2 (2011) as Sheriff (voice)
Voices of History (2014, Short) as Narrator (voice)
Cars 3 (2017) as Sheriff (voice)

Television
Cars Toons (2010, 1 episode) as Sheriff (voice)

Video games
Cars (2006) as Sheriff (voice)
Cars Mater-National Championship (2007) as Sheriff (voice)
Cars Race-O-Rama (2009) as Sheriff (voice) 
Cars 2: The Video Game (2011) as Sheriff (voice)
Kinect Rush: A Disney-Pixar Adventure (2012) as Sheriff (voice)

Theme park attractions
Radiator Springs Racers (2012) as Sheriff

References

External links
 Michael Wallis Online (official website)
 
Voices of Oklahoma interview with Michael Wallis. First person interview conducted on March 3, 2011, with Michael Wallis. 

1945 births
21st-century American historians
21st-century American male writers
Historians of the American West
Historians of the United States
Living people
Journalists from Missouri
University of Missouri alumni
American male voice actors
Writers from Tulsa, Oklahoma
21st-century American male actors
Historians from Missouri
Historians of transport
Writers from St. Louis
20th-century American historians
American male non-fiction writers
20th-century American male writers